Chakudar (also Romanized as Chakūdar) is a village in Marzdaran Rural District, Marzdaran District, Sarakhs County, Razavi Khorasan Province, Iran. As of the 2006 census, its population was 722, with 181 families.

References 

Populated places in Sarakhs County